Burgess Jenkins (born October 24, 1973) is an American actor. He is known for work in the film Remember the Titans opposite Academy Award winner Denzel Washington; and as Hilary Swank's husband David Winter in The Reaping (2007).

Early life
Jenkins was born and raised in Winston-Salem, North Carolina and is a graduate of Richard J. Reynolds High School and Lenoir-Rhyne University.

Career
Jenkins portrayed religious leader John Wesley in the award-winning independent film Wesley (2009) with Kevin McCarthy and June Lockhart.

On television, Jenkins played Bobby Irons throughout season six on the hit CW series One Tree Hill, recurred on Marry Me with Lucy Liu and Tony & Ridley Scott's A&E Thriller COMA. He has guest starred on numerous shows including: Drop Dead Diva, Revolution,  JAG and many more.

Jenkins appeared on ABC's Nashville as Randy Roberts, long-time friend and music producer to Rayna Jaymes (Connie Britton). The series reunited Jenkins with his Remember the Titans co-star Hayden Panettiere.

Jenkins signed onto season seven of the Lifetime Network's flagship original series Army Wives. He played Staff Sergeant Eddie Hall, married to Maggie Hall (Torrey DeVitto), as part of a new family entering the cast.

Jenkins trained at the famed "Playhouse West" with Robert Carnegie and Academy Award nominated actor Jeff Goldblum.

From 2014 to 2016, Jenkins played Billy Abbott in the Daytime Emmy-winning CBS soap opera The Young and the Restless.

Filmography

Film

Television

References

External links
 
 

1973 births
Living people
Lenoir–Rhyne University alumni
American male film actors
American male television actors
Male actors from North Carolina
Actors from Winston-Salem, North Carolina
20th-century American male actors
21st-century American male actors